This is a list of mayors in Costa Rica.

See also 

 Local government in Costa Rica

References

Mayors
Mayors
Costa Rica, mayors